Samuel Alfred De Grasse (June 12, 1875 – November 29, 1953) was a Canadian actor. He was the uncle of cinematographer Robert De Grasse.

Biography
Samuel Alfred De Grasse was born in Bathurst, New Brunswick to Lange De Grasse (1828–1891) and Helene ( Comeau; 1836-?), both of French-Canadian descent. He trained to be a dentist, and married Annie McDonnell in 1904. Their daughter, Clementine Bell, was born in 1906. Annie died in 1909 while giving birth to another daughter, Olive, who also died. In 1910, Samuel was practicing dentistry and he and his daughter Clementine were living in Providence, Rhode Island along with his older sister, Mrs. Clementine Fauchy, and her 14-year-old son, Jerome Fauchy.

He married British actress Ada Fuller Golden and became a step-father to her three children. His own elder brother, Joe, went into the fledgling movie business and Sam decided to also give it a try. He traveled to New York City and, in 1912, he appeared in his first motion picture. At first he played standard secondary characters such as Dr. Robert Armstrong in Blind Husbands (1919), but when fellow Canadian Mary Pickford set up her own studio with her husband Douglas Fairbanks, he joined them. He portrayed the villainous Prince John in Douglas Fairbanks' 1922 Robin Hood. Afterward, he began to specialize in crafty or slimy villainous roles, such as Senator Charles Summer in The Birth of a Nation (1915), the mill owner Arthur Jenkins in Intolerance (1916), John Carver in The Courtship of Miles Standish (1923), Colonel Lestron in The Eagle of the Sea (1926), a pirate lieutenant in The Black Pirate (1926), a Pharisee in The King of Kings (1927) and King James in The Man Who Laughs (1928). Mary Pickford named him as one of her favorite stars. 

In the 1960s, Jackie Coogan claimed Jean Harlow had lived in De Grasse's apartment for two years and was married to him when she was 16. At the time both de Grasse and Harlow were deceased. The claim was untrue -- Harlow was married to Charles McGrew when she was 16. However, she did appear as an extra in the film Honor Bound (1928), in which De Grasse played "Blood Keller".

Death
De Grasse lived on the west coast until his death at age 78 in Hollywood from a heart attack during his sleep. He is interred in the Forest Lawn Memorial Park Cemetery in Glendale, California.

Selected filmography

 The Birth of a Nation (1915) - Sen. Charles Sumner (uncredited)
 A Man and His Mate (1915) - Choo
 A Child of God (1915) - Jim MacPherson
 Martyrs of the Alamo (1915) - Silent Smith
 Cross Currents (1915) - Silas Randolph
 The Price of Power (1916) - James Garwood
 Acquitted (1916) - Ira Wolcott
 The Good Bad-Man (1916) - The Wolf / Bud Frazer
 An Innocent Magdalene (1916) - Forbes Stewart
 The Half-Breed (1916) - Sheriff Dunn
 Intolerance (1916) - Arthur Jenkins
 Diane of the Follies (1916) - Phillips Christy
 The Children of the Feud (1916) - Dr. Richard Cavanagh
 Jim Bludso (1917) - Ben Merrill
 Her Official Fathers (1917) - Ethan Dexter
 An Old-Fashioned Young Man (1917) - Harold T. King
 Madame Bo-Peep (1917) - Jose Alvarez
 Wild and Woolly (1917) - Steve Shelby - Indian Agent
 The Empty Gun (1917, Short) - Jim
 Anything Once (1917) - Herbert Wendling
 The Winged Mystery (1917) - Mortimer Eddington
 The Scarlet Car (1917) - Ernest Peabody
 Six-Shooter Andy (1918) - Tom Slade
 Brace Up (1918) - National Jim
 The Guilt of Silence (1918) - Gambler Joe
 The Mortgaged Wife (1918) - Meyer
 Smashing Through (1918) - Earl Foster
 Winner Takes All (1918) - Mark Thorne
 A Woman's Fool (1918) - Minor Role
 A Law Unto Herself (1918) - Kurt Von Klassner
 The Narrow Path (1918) - Malcolm Dion
 The Hope Chest (1918) - Ballantyne, Sr.
 Sis Hopkins (1919) - Vibert
 The Silk-Lined Burglar (1919) - Boston Blackie
 The Exquisite Thief (1919) - Shaver Michael
 Heart o' the Hills (1919) - Steve Honeycutt
 Blind Husbands (1919) - The Husband, Dr. Robert Armstrong
 Uncharted Channels (1920) - Nicholas Schonnn
 Moon Madness (1920) - Adrien
 The Devil's Pass Key (1920) - Warren Goodwright
 The Skywayman (1920) - Dr. Wayne Leveridge
 The Little Grey Mouse (1920) - John Cumberland
 Unseen Forces (1920) - Captain Stanley
 The Broken Gate (1920) - 'Hod' Brooks
 The Cheater Reformed (1921) - Thomas Edinburgh
 Courage (1921) - Stephan Blackmoore
 A Wife's Awakening (1921) - George Otis
 Robin Hood (1922) - Prince John
 Forsaking All Others (1922) - Dr. Mason
 Slippy McGee (1923) - Father De Rance
 Circus Days (1923) - Lord
 The Spoilers (1923) - Judge Stillman
 A Prince of a King (1923) - Duke Roberto
 The Dancer of the Nile (1923) - Pasheri
 In the Palace of the King (1923) - King Philip II
 Tiger Rose (1923) - Dr. Cusick
 The Courtship of Miles Standish (1923) - John Carver
 Painted People (1924) - Henry Parrish
 Pagan Passions (1924) - Frank Langley
 A Self-Made Failure (1924) - Cyrus Cruikshank
 The Virgin (1924) - Ricardo Ruiz
 On the Threshold (1925) - Daniel Masters
 The Mansion of Aching Hearts (1925) - Martin Craig
 One Year to Live (1925) - Dr. Lucien La Pierre
 Sun-Up (1925) - Sheriff Weeks
 Heir-Loons (1925)
 Sally, Irene and Mary (1925) - Officer O'Dare
 Mike (1926) - Brush
 The Black Pirate (1926) - Pirate Lieutenant
 Her Second Chance (1926) - Beachey
 Broken Hearts of Hollywood (1926) - Defense Attorney
 The Eagle of the Sea (1926) - Col. Lestron
 Love's Blindness (1926) - Benjamin Levy
 When a Man Loves (1927) - Comte Guillot de Morfontaine
 King of Kings (1927) - Pharisee
 Captain Salvation (1927) - Peter Campbell
 The Fighting Eagle (1927) - Talleyrand
 The Country Doctor (1927) - Ira Harding
 The Wreck of the Hesperus (1927) - Capt. David Slocum
 The Man Who Laughs (1928) - King James II
 Honor Bound (1928) - Blood Keller
 The Racket (1928) - District Attorney Welch
 Our Dancing Daughters (1928) - Freddie's Father
 Dog Law (1928) - Minor Role (uncredited)
 The Farmer's Daughter (1928) - (uncredited)
 Silks and Saddles (1929) - William Morrissey
 The Last Performance (1929) - District Attorney
 Wall Street (1929) - John Willard
 Captain of the Guard (1930) - Bazin (final film role)

See also
 Other Canadian pioneers in early Hollywood

References

External links

 
 De Grasse at Northernstars.ca

Canadian male silent film actors
Canadian male film actors
Male actors from New Brunswick
1875 births
1953 deaths
People from Bathurst, New Brunswick
Burials at Forest Lawn Memorial Park (Glendale)
20th-century Canadian male actors
Canadian expatriate male actors in the United States